Añelo is a department located in the east of Neuquén Province, Argentina.

Geography 
The Department is bounded by Pehuenches Department in the north, Rio Negro Province to the east, Confluencia Department on the southeast, Zapala Department to the South-southeast, Picunches Department at southwest and Loncopué Department on the west.

Economy
The major product of the area is grapes mostly used for wine-making.

Culture 
The Museo del Sitio is located in this department, a Mapuche museum featuring cultural life and a graveyard.

References

Departments of Neuquén Province